The Squatter's Daughter is a 1933 Australian melodrama directed by Ken G. Hall and starring Jocelyn Howarth. One of the most popular Australian films of the 1930s, it is based on a 1907 play by Bert Bailey and Edmund Duggan which had been previously adapted to the screen in 1910.

It has been described as "part of an Australian subgenre, the outdoors colonial melodrama... stories set on outback stations featuring unscrupulous farmers, heroic foremen, upper class twits visiting from England, family secrets and feisty horse-rising heroines. The latter formed the "squatter’s daughter" archetype – the brave, beautiful farm girl who galloped away from bushfires – and meant female starring roles were often stronger in Australian rather than American westerns. "

Plot
Joan Enderby runs her family sheep station but is about to lose it because she can't afford to buy the lease from the Sherringtons, who run the neighbouring station, Waratah. While Ironbark Sherrington has been away in London looking for a cure to save his sight, his son Clive and overseer, Fletcher have planned to bankrupt Enderby station. Joan is helped by a mysterious newcomer, Wayne Ridgeway, who is actually the rightful heir to the Sherrington estate.

There is a subplot about Joan's crippled brother Jimmy, who is in love with Zena, daughter of Jebal Zim, an Afghan trader. When Zim tries to tell Ironbark that Ridgeway is the true heir, Fletcher kills him and abducts Zena. Joan and Ridgeway manage to fight a bushfire that threatens Enderby, deliver sheep, rescue Zena and capture Fletcher.

Cast
 Jocelyn Howarth as Joan Enderby
 Grant Lyndsay as Wayne Ridgeway
 John Warwick as Clive Sherrington
 Fred MacDonald as shearer
 W. Lane-Bayliff as Old Ironbark
 Dorothy Dunckley as Miss Ramsbottom
 Owen Ainley as Jimmy
 Cathleen Esler as Zena
 George Cross
 Claude Turton as Jebal Zim
 George Lloyd as Shearer
 Les Warton
 Katie Towers as Poppy

Production

Scripting
Cinesound had originally intended to follow up their successful first feature, On Our Selection (1932) with an adaptation of The Silence of Dean Maitland. However they had difficulty finding appropriate actors to play the leads and instead decided to adapt the 1907 play The Squatter's Daughter, which had previously been filmed in 1910.

Director Ken G. Hall hired novelist E. V. Timms to work on him with the adaptation, but Hall was not happy with the result, so he brought on his old boss, Gayne Dexter, to do a rewrite. A novelisation of the script by Charles Melaun was published in 1933.

Casting
Jocelyn Howarth was a discovery of director Ken G. Hall. She moved to Hollywood and had a career under the name "Constance Worth". She was paid £6 a week.

Grant Lyndsay had previously played the romantic lead in On Our Selection (1932).

Filming
Shooting commenced February 1932 at Cinesound's studio in Bondi and on location at Goonoo Goonoo station near Tamworth. The bushfire finale was filmed near Wallacia, west of Sydney. During this sequence, the crew placed old nitrate film amongst the trees for the fire to burn more fiercely. It resulted in extra high flames, although Grant Lyndsay hurt his hand diving into a pool, and Ken Hall and Frank Hurley were singed. Jocelyn Howarth was also injured during the making of the movie.

Filming was scheduled to take ten weeks but because of poor weather it ended up taking eighteen. There was additional filming on board a ship a number of months later.

Reception
Australian reviews were generally positive and the movie was successful at the box office. By the end of 1934 it had earned an estimated profit of £5,900 and by the end of 1935 it had grossed over £25,000 in Australia and New Zealand.

UK distribution rights were bought by MGM for £7,500; the film was released there under the title Down Under.

In 1952 Hall estimated the film had earned just under £50,000.

References

External links
The Squatter's Daughter in the Internet Movie Database
The Squatter's Daughter at Australian Screen Online
The Squatter's Daughter at National Film and Sound Archive
The Squatter's Daughter at Oz Movies
Review of film at Variety

1933 films
Films directed by Ken G. Hall
Australian black-and-white films
Australian drama films
1933 drama films
Melodrama films
1930s Australian films
1930s English-language films
Cinesound Productions films